Camaleones (Chameleons) is a 2009/2010 Mexican neo-noir vigilante heist thriller telenovela produced by Televisa. The soap opera premiered on Mexico's Canal de las Estrellas, replacing the completed TV series Verano de Amor. Camaleones is produced by Rosy Ocampo ( La Campestre or Rosy la del Campo), who has produced several popular telenovelas, such as Amor sin Maquillaje, Las Tontas No Van al Cielo and La Fea Mas Bella. Filming took place in Mexico City and Xochitepec in June 2009, and lasted approximately 7 months. The telenovela premiered on Univision in the United States on May 4, 2010.

Belinda, Alfonso Herrera and Edith González star as the protagonists, while Guillermo García Cantú, José Luis Reséndez, Grettell Valdez, Karla Álvarez and Manuel "Flaco" Ibáñez star as the antagonists.

Plot and themes
Camaleones is the story of Valentina and Sebastian, who are both skilled thieves. They are united when a man they call "El Amo" forces them to commit crimes posing as a prefect and an art teacher at the school of San Bartolome. They have to play along in order to protect their loved ones.

They work together and say they are brother and sister. They become friends and then fall in love, although something always seems to come between them and their love. They discover many things about "El Amo", and they begin to hate each other because of the lies which "El Amo" had told them. Then, they decide to go separate ways: Sebastian with his father and Valentina as far away as she can.

But before they can leave the area, the police arrive, and when they are about to take Valentina and Sebastian, she shouts Sebastian's name and says she is pregnant. While in jail, the captain receives a video saying Valentina and Sebastian are innocent, and they are scheduled for release.

Valentina gets out a few hours earlier. When she sees one of the teachers on top of the roof of the school building crying, she goes up there to speak to her, and she says that "Augusto" killed many people. Augusto shows up on top of the roof and decides to kill Valentina with his gun. "El Amo" shows up too and tells him he is the father of the man whom he killed years ago, revealing himself to be Leonidas, the school gardener.

When Leonidas fights off Augusto, Augusto shoots him, then Leonidas pushes Augusto off the roof, killing him. Leonidas (El Amo) also dies from the wound. Meanwhile, Solange's mom shows up with Sebastian, and she sees that Augusto and Leonidas are dead.

Two months later, Valentina and Sebastian are finally together and happy because she is pregnant. Everyone is celebrating that everyone is graduating from school, and Solange decides to stay and not go to the United States for college, a decision that makes Francisca and Ulises happy. The soap opera ends with Valentina and Sebastian kissing, while the band Camaleones sings a song.

Cast

Main 

 Edith González as Francisca Campos
 Belinda as Valentina Izaguirre
 Guillermo García Cantú as Augusto Ponce
 Alfonso Herrera as Sebastián Jaramillo

Secondary 

 Manuel 'Flaco' Ibáñez as Leónidas
 Ana Bertha Espín as Lupita Morán
 Sherlyn as Solange Ponce de León
 Pee Wee as Ulises Morán
 José Elías Moreno as Armando Jaramillo
 Luis Manuel Ávila as Eusebio Portillo
 José Luis Reséndez as Pedro Recalde
 Mariana Ávila as Carmen Castillo
 Marisol Santacruz as Magdalena Orozco
 Ferdinando Valencia as Patricio Calderón
 Flor Rubio as Irene 
 Alberich Bormann as Féderico Díaz Ballesteros
 Carla Cardona as Mercedes Márquez
 Erik Díaz as Lucio Barragán
 Juan Carlos Flores as Bruno Pintos Castro
 Lucía Zerecero as Rocío Santoscoy
 Mariluz Bermúdez as Lorena González
 Michelle Renaud as Betina Montenegro
 Paul Stanley as Rolando Rincón
 Taide as Cristina Hernández
 Ricardo de Pascual as Conrado Tapia
 Erik Guecha as Gerardo Zúñiga
 Lilibeth as Sabrina
 Eduardo Liñán as Víttorio Barragán
 Esteban Franco as Señor Pintos
 Ginny Hoffman as Gabriela
 Jessica Salazar as Catalina de Saavedra
 Jorge Alberto Bolaños as Vincente Villoro
 Mónica Dossetti as Señora de Díaz
 Queta Lavat as Graciela
 Rafael del Villar as Efraín Castillo / Señor Montenegro
 Ricardo Vera as Efraín Castillo
 Renée Varsi as Norma de Pintos

Guest starts 
 Roberto Blandón as Javier Saavedra
 Karla Álvarez as Ágata Menéndez

Special participation 
 Roberto Ballesteros as Ricardo Calderón
 Amairani as Señora de Rincón
 Anaís as Evangelina de Márquez
 Eduardo Cáceres as José Ignacio Márquez
 Grettell Valdez as Silvana

Music 

Camaleones: Música de la Telenovela is the soundtrack album for the Mexican telenovela Camaleones and the debut studio album by Camaleones. It was released in Mexico on November 24, 2009.

Track listing

Released on DVD 
As they released a CD with the songs of the telenovela, the May 14, 2010 was released a DVD.

Awards and nominations

References

External links
 Official website

Mexican telenovelas
Televisa telenovelas
2009 telenovelas
2009 Mexican television series debuts
2010 Mexican television series endings
Spanish-language telenovelas
Television shows set in Mexico City